Tagansky (masculine), Taganskaya (feminine), or Taganskoye (neuter) may refer to:

Tagansky District, a district of Moscow
 in Moscow 
Taganskaya (Koltsevaya line), a Moscow Metro station on the Koltsevaya line
Taganskaya (Tagansko-Krasnopresnenskaya line), a Moscow Metro station on the Tagansko-Krasnopresnenskaya line
Tagansky Protected Command Point, a bunker underneath Moscow

See also

Taganka (disambiguation)